Jerko Leko (born 9 April 1980) is a Croatian professional football manager and former player, who is the current manager of the second-tier Druga HNL club Jarun. He primarily played as a central midfielder, but could also operate as a right one, or more defensively, as a right-back.

Club career
Leko's career began with Dinamo Zagreb in 2000 in his native Croatia, although he was not an immediate success. After spending some time on loan at Croatia Sesvete, he became a regular starter in 2001–02 season, helping Dinamo win the Croatian Cup, scoring in the final against Varteks Varaždin and being named Man of the Match. Leko eventually moved to Dynamo Kyiv in 2002 for €5.5 million (then a club record). In his first season in Ukraine, Dynamo won the double, with Leko playing 18 times.

In February 2006, it was announced that Leko would be leaving Dynamo Kyiv, having turned down a new contract offer. He subsequently signed for French side AS Monaco on a free transfer on 4 June 2006.

In July 2009, The Times reported that he had turned down a move to English Premier League club Wolverhampton Wanderers as they would not meet his wage demands of £30,000 per week (approx. $49,000) net. On 18 June 2010, Bucaspor signed Leko to a two-year deal on a free transfer from Monaco. On 25 May, it was confirmed that Leko signed a two-year deal with Dinamo Zagreb.

In August 2014 he moved to NK Lokomotiva on loan. In 2015, he permanently joined Lokomotiva for the last season of his professional career.

International career
Leko made his Croatia national team debut in 2002 against Hungary, but was not included in the 2002 World Cup squad. He scored a goal in a 4–0 victory against Belgium in a Euro 2004 qualifier, and was included in the final stage's squad, but only played 22 minutes during the tournament.

Selected to represent the nation in the 2006 World Cup, Leko made two substitute appearances, against Brazil and Australia. He was also part of the final squad for Euro 2008.

At the tournament quarter-final clash between Croatia and Turkey, Leko was supposed to make his first appearance in the competition as a late substitute as Slaven Bilić wanted to put him on to hold on for a Croatian victory. However, officiating referee Roberto Rosetti disallowed the substitution from occurring as he also allowed Turkey an extra two minutes to find a late equalizer to send the game to a penalty shootout which Turkey eventually won. Leko's last international appearance came a year after Euro 2008 in a friendly match in 2009 against Qatar.

International goals

Managerial career
Leko started his managerial career by succeeding Besnik Prenga on the bench of Lokomotiva's U19s in the summer of 2017, leading them through 2017–18 UEFA Youth League. They were, however, eliminated by Željezničar in the second round.

On 5 January 2021, he succeeded Boris Perković on the bench of Hrvatski Dragovoljac, who held first place on the Druga HNL table at the time of his hiring. However, on 9 January 2021, just four days after the appointment at Hrvatski Dragovoljac, Leko left the club and succeeded Goran Tomić as the head coach of Lokomotiva in the Prva HNL. He had his managerial debut on 22 January in a home 3–0 defeat to Osijek. He achieved his first career victory on 30 January, beating Hajduk Split 1–0 away. He was sacked on 13 March, after a 1–0 defeat to Istra 1961.

In July, 2021, Leko was named the manager of Jarun in their debut season in the second-tier Druga HNL.

Managerial statistics

Honours

Player
Dinamo Zagreb
Croatian First League: 2011–12, 2012–13, 2013–14
Croatian Cup: 2000–01, 2001–02, 2011–12
Croatian Super Cup: 2002, 2013

Dynamo Kyiv
Ukrainian Premier League: 2002–03, 2003–04
Ukrainian Cup: 2002–03, 2004–05, 2005–06

References

External links
 

1980 births
Living people
Footballers from Zagreb
Association football midfielders
Croatian footballers
Croatia youth international footballers
Croatia under-21 international footballers
Croatia international footballers
UEFA Euro 2004 players
2006 FIFA World Cup players
UEFA Euro 2008 players
GNK Dinamo Zagreb players
NK Croatia Sesvete players
FC Dynamo Kyiv players
AS Monaco FC players
Bucaspor footballers
NK Lokomotiva Zagreb players
Croatian Football League players
Ukrainian Premier League players
Ligue 1 players
Süper Lig players
Croatian expatriate footballers
Expatriate footballers in Ukraine
Expatriate footballers in Monaco
Expatriate footballers in France
Expatriate footballers in Turkey
Croatian expatriate sportspeople in Ukraine
Croatian expatriate sportspeople in Monaco
Croatian expatriate sportspeople in France
Croatian expatriate sportspeople in Turkey
Croatian football managers
NK Hrvatski Dragovoljac managers
NK Lokomotiva Zagreb managers